James, Jim, or Jimmy Moore may refer to:

Authors
James Moore (Cornish author) (1929–2017), author of works on George Gurdjieff
James Moore (biographer) (born 1947), author of biographies of Charles Darwin
James W. Moore (author) (1938–2019), author of Christian ministry literature
James A. Moore (born 1965), horror and fantasy author
James C. Moore, author of Bush's Brain: How Karl Rove Made George W. Bush Presidential
James P. Moore Jr. (born 1953), author, professor, television commentator and lecturer

Music and performing arts
Butch Moore (James Augustine Moore, 1938–2001), Irish showband icon during the 1960s
James Moore (singer) (1956–2000), American gospel artist
James E. Moore Jr. (born 1951), American composer 
Slim Harpo (James Isaac Moore, 1924–1970), blues musician
Jim Moore, actor who performed in Coonskin

Politicians
James Moore (Canadian politician) (born 1976), Canadian cabinet minister
Jim Moore (Montana politician) (1927–2017), Montana state senator
James Moore (Newfoundland politician) (1869–1946), Newfoundland merchant and politician
James William Moore (1818–1877), Confederate politician during the American Civil War
James Moore (governor) (1650–1706), colonial governor of South Carolina
James Moore II (1667–1723), his son, governor of the Province of South Carolina
James Aaron Moore, member of the Mississippi House of Representatives

Sports

Baseball
James Moore (baseball) (1916–2016), professional baseball player in the Negro leagues, also known as Red Moore
Jim Moore (baseball) (1903–1973), pitcher in Major League Baseball
Jimmy Moore (baseball) (1903–1986), left fielder in Major League Baseball

Football
Jimmy Moore (footballer, born 1889) (1889–1972), English international football player for Derby County
James Moore (footballer, born 1891) (1891–1972), English football player for Barnsley, Southampton and Leeds United
James Moore (footballer, born 1987), English football player for Charlotte Eagles
Jim Moore (Australian footballer) (1891–1987), Australian rules footballer for Essendon and Melbourne

Other sports
Bouncy Moore (James E. Moore, born 1951), American long jumper
James Moore (New Zealand cricketer) (1877–1933), New Zealand cricketer
Jemmy Moore (James Moore, 1839–1890), Australian cricketer
James Moore (cyclist) (1849–1935), English cycling racer
Cowboy Jimmy Moore (1910–1999), American pool champion
James Moore (boxer) (born 1978), Irish professional boxer
James Moore (fencer) (1890–1971), American Olympic fencer
James Moore (pentathlete) (born 1935), American Olympic silver medalist in modern pentathlon at the 1964 Summer Olympics
Jimmy Moore (basketball, born 1973), American basketball player
Jimmy Moore (basketball, born 1952), American basketball player
James Moore (rugby union) (born 1993), Australian rugby union player

Other
James Moore (furniture designer) (died 1726), English cabinet maker
James Moore (Continental Army officer) (1737–1777), American Revolutionary War general
James Moore (engineer) (1826–1887), Australian railway engineer
James Moore (bishop) (1834–1904), Irish-born Bishop of Ballarat, Victoria
James Beach Moore (1842–1931), Canadian Quaker
James Edward Moore (1902–1986), U.S. Army general
Jimmy Moore (bishop) (1933–2005), Irish bishop
James F. Moore (born 1948), senior fellow at Harvard Law School's Berkman Center for Internet and Society
James T. Moore (meteorologist) (1952–2006), American atmospheric scientist from Cornell University and Saint Louis University
James E. Moore (judge) (born 1936), associate justice of the South Carolina Supreme Court
James T. Moore (USMC) (1895–1953), United States Marine Corps general
James L. Moore III, academic administrator at the Ohio State University
Jim Moore (photographer), American photographer
James W. Moore (legal scholar) (1905–1994), Sterling Professor at Yale Law School
SS James Bennett Moore, a Liberty ship

See also
Jamie Moore (disambiguation)